The St. Louis Cardinals 2006 season was the team's 125th season in St. Louis, Missouri and the 115th season in the National League. The season started out with a bang, as the team raced out to a 31-16 record by late May.  Momentum would be slowed by injuries, as starting pitcher Mark Mulder was lost for the year, while center fielder Jim Edmonds and shortstop David Eckstein missed large amounts of playing time in the second half.  Poor performance from several key players also hampered the team: starting pitcher Jason Marquis compiled a 6.02 ERA, starting pitcher Sidney Ponson was cut due to ineffectiveness, closer Jason Isringhausen blew ten saves before undergoing season-ending hip surgery in September, and catcher Yadier Molina had a poor offensive year, batting .216.

All this led to a difficult season, despite that quick start, one that included two eight-game losing streaks (the longest such streaks for the franchise since 1988) and a seven-game losing streak, losing months in June, August and September, and an 83-78 record, the worst for the Cardinals since the 1999 team finished 75-86.  However, that record was still good enough to finish first in a weak National League Central.  On the season's final day, the Cardinals made the playoffs for the sixth time in the last seven seasons, edging the second-place Houston Astros by a game and a half. Once the playoffs began, the lightly regarded Cardinals surprised baseball fans everywhere by beating the San Diego Padres in the four-game Division Series, beating the New York Mets in the seven-game NLCS, and beating the Detroit Tigers in the 2006 World Series four games to one, winning the tenth, and probably most unlikely, World Series championship in franchise history.  Their .516 winning percentage is the lowest ever for a World Series champion.  This season ironically contrasted with 2004 as that team was considered the overwhelming favorites but were swept in the World Series, resulting in a bittersweet three-year period for the Cardinals.

Following the season, the Cardinals ended a 19-year association with KPLR and returned to KSDK for the first time since 1987.

Regular season

Season standings

National League Central

Record vs. opponents

Roster

Player stats

Batting
Note: G = Games played; AB = At bats; R = Runs; H = Hits; 2B = Doubles; 3B = Triples; HR = Home runs; RBI = Runs batted in; SB = Stolen bases; BB = Walks; AVG = Batting average; SLG = Slugging average

Source:

Pitching
Note: W = Wins; L = Losses; ERA = Earned run average; G = Games pitched; GS = Games started; SV = Saves; IP = Innings pitched; H = Hits allowed; R = Runs allowed; ER = Earned runs allowed; BB = Walks allowed; SO = Strikeouts

Source:

First season at the New Busch Stadium
The new season brought a Cardinals team that was much changed from the one that went 100-62 in 2005 but fell to the Houston Astros in the NLCS. Starting pitcher Matt Morris, second baseman Mark Grudzielanek, left fielder Reggie Sanders, and relief pitcher Julián Tavárez left the team via free agency. Relief pitcher Ray King was traded to Colorado. Right fielder Larry Walker retired. Brought in to replace the departed Cardinals were right fielder Juan Encarnación, starting pitcher Sidney Ponson, relief pitchers Braden Looper and Ricardo Rincón, all via free agency, and second baseman Aaron Miles, acquired in the Ray King trade. Left field was left unsettled in the offseason and would remain so all year, with no player getting more than one-third of the playing time at that position.

The Cardinals opened the 2006 season on April 3, on the road against the Philadelphia Phillies. St. Louis won 13-5. Albert Pujols homered twice, newly acquired second baseman Aaron Miles had two doubles and a triple, and Scott Rolen, who missed most of the 2005 season with a shoulder injury, had a grand slam.   
   
The Cardinals' home opener was Monday, April 10th.  The Cardinals came back from an early deficit to beat Milwaukee 6-4. Pujols had a home run (his fourth in eight games) and Mark Mulder won his first game of the year.  

On April 16 against the Cincinnati Reds, Pujols continued his hot start, hitting three home runs, including a walk-off two-run homer in the bottom of the ninth to give the Cardinals an 8-7 victory. The three-dinger day was the second of his career and gave him eight home runs in the Cardinals' first twelve games. St. Louis would continue playing well through April and finished the month with a record of 17-8.

The Cardinals continued to play well in the month of May, but injuries began to accumulate. Relief pitcher Ricardo Rincón, on the disabled list since April 28, had season-ending shoulder surgery on May 12. Ponson went on the disabled list with a strained muscle in his right arm, and ace Chris Carpenter went on the DL with bursitis at the end of the month. Rookie Anthony Reyes got two callups to make emergency starts for Carpenter and Ponson, earning one victory and one no-decision. Jim Edmonds missed time with an abdominal infection and many of the players fell victim to a flu bug in the clubhouse. But Albert Pujols continued his great year, hitting 11 home runs in May after 14 in April, Jason Isringhausen was 10-10 in save opportunities, and the team went 17-11 for the month and finish May with a record of 34-19, fifteen games over .500. On May 28, Mulder, who had been very effective for most of the first two months of the season, was tagged for eight runs in 4.1 innings as the Cardinals lost to San Diego 10-8.  It would be a sign of things to come for St. Louis' #2 starter.

Summer slump

In June the Cardinals began to struggle. On June 4, Albert Pujols went on the disabled list for the first time in his career with a strained right oblique muscle. Two days later, Isringhausen gave up a three-run homer in the ninth inning and the Cardinals lost to Cincinnati 8-7. (Isringhausen blew four saves in June.) Two more losses to the Reds dropped the Cardinals into a brief tie with Cincinnati for first place, but they won seven of their next nine to maintain possession of first place and improve their record to 42-26. The Cardinals were sixteen games over .500, the high-water mark for 2006.

St. Louis then traveled to Chicago for a series against the defending world champion Chicago White Sox. They lost the opener 20-6. Mark Mulder's ERA rose to 6.09, and two days later he went on the disabled list. They lost the second game 13-5, with starting pitcher Jason Marquis giving up all thirteen runs. The next night, rookie Anthony Reyes, called back up to the big leagues with Mulder injured and Ponson banished to the bullpen, threw a one-hitter—but that one hit was a home run by Jim Thome, and the Cardinals lost 1-0. Reyes' gem was also the first game back for Albert Pujols after eighteen days on the disabled list. After the sweep by the White Sox the Cardinals were swept by the Detroit Tigers. Two more losses to the Cleveland Indians extended the streak to eight losses in a row, the longest such streak for a Cardinal team in 18 years. They finally snapped the streak with a 5-4 victory over Cleveland on June 29. For the month, St. Louis went 9-16 and fell to eight games over .500 at 43-35.

July would see much turnover in the roster as the Cardinals struggled to regain their equilibrium. On July 5 Jeff Weaver was acquired from the Los Angeles Angels of Anaheim in a trade, and two days later, Sidney Ponson, previously plagued with injuries and ineffectiveness and demoted to the bullpen, was released. At the end of the month, St. Louis traded Héctor Luna to Cleveland for Ronnie Belliard, who took the second base job that Luna and Miles had shared, and acquired relief pitcher Jorge Sosa from Atlanta for a minor leaguer. Chris Duncan started getting more and more playing time in the outfield and responded with a .324 average for the month. In other developments, Jason Marquis, who gave up thirteen runs in a start against the White Sox in June, gave up twelve runs in a 14-5 disaster against the Atlanta Braves on July 18. Marquis became the first big-league pitcher since Chubby Dean of the 1940 Philadelphia Athletics to cough up twelve runs in a game twice in the same season.
On July 19, a storm carrying winds of 80 mph struck the new Busch, knocking over concession stands, ripping the tarp, and injuring thirty people.

The yo-yo season continued. The Cardinals won seven in a row and 13 out of 16 in the middle of July (a surge largely fueled by a sweep of all seven games with the Los Angeles Dodgers in 2006) and by July 26, they had regained their previous high of 16 games over .500, at 58-42. However, the end of the month saw a four-game sweep by the Cubs at Wrigley Field and a losing streak that would extend into August. St. Louis went 15-11 in July and finished the month at 58-46. The Cincinnati Reds continued to dog the Cardinals' footsteps, sitting 3.5 games out of first place at the end of July.

Pitching continued to be problematic for the Cardinals in August. Mark Mulder, attempting to come back from his shoulder injury, made two starts towards the end of the month, got hit very hard both times, and return to the disabled list, where he would stay for the rest of the season. He ended the worst year of his career with a 7.14 ERA. Jason Marquis' miserable year got even worse, with a 6.75 ERA for August. New acquisition Jeff Weaver followed up his 6.46 July with a 5.67 August. Closer Jason Isringhausen also struggled, blowing two saves, taking three losses and posting a 5.06 ERA for the month.

Injuries took their toll on position players as well. Jim Edmonds missed half the month with post-concussion syndrome and David Eckstein went on the disabled list with a strained oblique muscle. The Cardinals signed Preston Wilson, who had been released by Houston, to fill the hole caused by Edmonds' injury.

St. Louis ended July by dropping four in a row and lost four more in a row to start August. After going 18 years without an eight-game losing streak the Redbirds now had their second of the 2006 season. They finally snapped that streak and played somewhat better for the rest of August, as Pujols and Rolen both continued to hit well and Chris Duncan, now playing almost every day, led the team with nine home runs for the month. Backup catcher Gary Bennett had a spectacular weekend at the end of August, homering and hitting a walk-off single to beat the Cubs on the 26th and hitting a walk-off grand slam to beat the Cubs again on the 27th. The Cardinals went 13-15 for the month and ended August with a record of 71-61, still enjoying an NL Central lead of five games over Cincinnati and six games over Houston.

September: Photo finish
The Cardinals' strange, up/down season would get even stranger in the final month, as the team staggered to the finish while trying to avoid a shocking collapse. As August passed into September, Eckstein was still on the DL and Edmonds was still absent from the lineup with post-concussion syndrome. On September 3, Pujols had his second three-homer game of the season and third of his career, as the Cardinals beat Pittsburgh 6-3. However, two days later the Cardinals were nearly no-hit; Ramón Ortiz of the Washington Nationals took a no-hitter into the ninth before Aaron Miles' single spoiled it. Ortiz settled for a 4-1 victory.  Just four days after that on September 9, the Cardinals again almost got no-hit, getting only one Scott Rolen double in a 3-0 loss to the Arizona Diamondbacks.

As the season wound down, St. Louis seemed to run out of gas. Edmonds and Eckstein missed almost the whole month with their injuries. Duncan, who'd made major contributions to a slumping offense in July and August, slumped to a .212 September. Even worse, Scott Rolen, the second-best hitter on the team for five months, went into a terrible slump and hit .227 for the final month. Encarnacion hit .238, Belliard .219, and Molina .224. The only players contributing offense in the final month were Pujols and Scott Spiezio, whose power surge allowed him to post a 1.042 OPS for the last month of the season.

On the pitching mound, Marquis ended his awful year with a dismal 7.25 ERA in September. His 6.02 ERA in 2006 was the worst amongst National League pitchers who qualified for the ERA title. Jason Isringhausen, who had been struggling all summer with a deteriorating hip, was finally lost for the season after blowing his tenth save of the year on September 6 against Washington. Rookie Adam Wainwright assumed the closer's role for the last few weeks of the season.

Despite all these difficulties the Cardinals succeeded in treading water for the first three weeks of the month, and, after a 12-2 victory against Milwaukee on September 19, stood at 80-69 for the season, seven games ahead of Cincinnati and  games ahead of Houston with twelve more games to play. However, the Cardinals proceeded to reel off a seven-game losing streak, their third of the season of seven games or longer. Included in the slide was a four-game sweep by the Astros, who won nine in a row from September 20 through September 28.

On September 27, St. Louis' seven-game lead had been sliced to  games over the hard-charging Astros. Houston won again that day, their eighth in a row. Trailing 2-1 in the bottom of the 8th inning to the San Diego Padres with two on and two out, Albert Pujols hit a three-run homer, his 47th of the year. New closer Wainwright made it stand up, and the losing streak was over. It was Pujols' 25th game-winning hit of the season. However, the next night Jason Marquis had one last terrible start, the Cards lost to Milwaukee 9-4, and the lead over the Astros shrank to 1/2 game. The sports world was rife with memories of the 1964 Philadelphia Phillies, who led by  games with 12 to go and lost ten in a row to lose the pennant to, ironically, the Cardinals.

On September 29, St. Louis beat Milwaukee 10-5 and the Astros lost to Atlanta, snapping their nine-game win streak and widening the lead to  games. On the 30th, Scott Spiezio hit a bases-loaded triple in the bottom of the 8th inning and the Cardinals beat Milwaukee 3-2. Needing only a win in Game 161 against Milwaukee on October 1, St. Louis lost 5-3, but the Astros had already lost 3-1 at Atlanta. The Cardinals had narrowly avoided collapse and won the NL Central with an 83-78 record. Had the Astros won their last game, the Cardinals would have had to play a rained-out make-up game against the San Francisco Giants to determine the tie breaker between the Astros and the Cardinals.

Postseason

Division Series

The Cardinals entered the postseason with the third-worst record in history for any MLB playoff team, beating only the 2005 Padres (82-80) and the 1973 New York Mets (82-79), and they had just endured a September record of 12–17.  Experts gave them little hope of advancing in October.  Yet the Cardinals proceeded to beat the NL West champion San Diego Padres in four games in the best-of-five Division Series.  Carpenter won two games in the series including the clinching Game 4, Albert Pujols hit .333 with a home run and a double, and Yadier Molina hit .308 (4-13).  St. Louis would advance to the NLCS to face the best team in the National League in 2006, the New York Mets.

League Championship Series

The Cardinals began the NLCS as huge underdogs to the New York Mets.  The Mets won fourteen games more than the Cardinals did in 2006.  Their offense scored 53 runs more than the Cardinals' did.  Their pitchers allowed 31 fewer.  In head-to-head contests during the season, the Mets won four of six from St. Louis.  Also, by virtue of the better record, the Mets would have home field advantage.

However, the series would be hard-fought by both sides.  New York won Game 1 2-0 behind the pitching of ace Tom Glavine and a two-run homer by Carlos Beltrán.  The Cardinals won Game 2 9-6 by scoring three runs off Met closer Billy Wagner in the top of the ninth inning, the rally started by a home run from light-hitting (16 career HR in 960 at-bats) So Taguchi.  St. Louis won Games 3 and 5 and New York won Games 4 and 6, setting up a winner-take-all Game 7 in New York.  Light drizzle fell all game, increasing to a light rain in the later innings.  The Mets scored in the bottom of the first on a double by Beltran and a single by Wright, but would not get another hit until the ninth.  The Cardinals evened it up at 1-1 in the second on singles by Molina (who followed up his Division Series success by hitting .348 in this series) and Edmonds and a sacrifice bunt by Belliard.  There the score would stay for seven innings, thanks in part to Met left fielder Endy Chávez, who made a leaping catch of Scott Rolen's almost-home run in the sixth and doubled Jim Edmonds off of first.

The game was still tied with one out in the top of the ninth when Rolen singled.  Molina, batting next, (and like Taguchi not a home run hitter, with 16 in 937 big-league at-bats), hit a two-run homer over the left field wall to give the Cardinals a 3-1 lead.  In the bottom of the ninth inning, the Mets loaded the bases with two out on singles by José Valentín and Chavez and a walk to catcher Paul Lo Duca.  That brought to the plate Cardinal-killer Carlos Beltrán (18 for 51 with seven home runs against St. Louis in the 2004 and 2006 NLCS), who in the regular season hit 41 home runs and drove in 116 runs.  St. Louis' rookie relief pitcher, Adam Wainwright, installed as closer only one month before, struck out Beltran on three pitches (the last a curveball looking), and the Cardinals won the series and the 17th National League pennant in franchise history.
Starting pitcher Jeff Suppan was named NLCS MVP.

World Series

St. Louis had been an underdog against the Padres, and won.  They had been a prohibitive underdog against the Mets, and won.  That did not prevent them from being an underdog for the third time against the American League champion Detroit Tigers, who had won 95 games in the regular season, knocked off the New York Yankees in the Division Series and swept the Oakland Athletics in the ALCS.  Bob Nightengale of USAToday expressed majority opinion when he said "Tigers in three".

Rookie Anthony Reyes, whose up-and-down season had ended with a 5.06 ERA, retired 17 Detroit hitters in a row in his Game 1 victory, Chris Carpenter threw eight shutout, three-hit innings in Game 3, and Cardinal pitchers overall had a 2.05 ERA for the Series.  Scott Rolen hit .421 for the Series, Yadier Molina finished off his superb October by hitting .412, and David Eckstein hit .364 and won the MVP.  Detroit, on the other hand, hit .199 and played poorly in the field, with eight errors in five games.  St. Louis came back from a 3-0 deficit to win Game 4 5-4 and get within one win of a title.  In the deciding Game 5, St. Louis carried a 4-2 lead into the ninth inning.  As 46,638 fans looked on, closer Wainwright got Magglio Ordóñez to ground out, gave up a double to Sean Casey, then got Iván Rodríguez to ground out to bring the Cardinals one out away from victory.  Plácido Polanco, a former Cardinal, drew a walk, putting the tying run on base.  Brandon Inge struck out on three pitches, and the St. Louis Cardinals won their tenth World Series championship in franchise history.  David Eckstein won Series MVP and a Chevrolet Corvette Z06.

Game log

|- style="background-color:#bbffbb"
| 1 || April 3 || @ Phillies || 13–5 || Carpenter || Lieber || || 44,614 || 1–0
|- style="background-color:#bbffbb"
| 2 || April 5 || @ Phillies || 4–3 || Thompson || Gordon ||Isringhausen  || 20,557 || 2–0
|- style="background-color:#bbffbb"
| 3 || April 6 || @ Phillies || 4–2 || Marquis || Lidle || Isringhausen  || 20,413 || 3–0
|- style="background-color:#ffbbbb"
| 4 || April 7 || @ Cubs || 1–5 || Maddux || Suppan ||  || 40,869 || 3–1
|- style="background-color:#ffbbbb"
| 5 || April 8 || @ Cubs || 2–3 || Howry || Thompson || Dempster || 40,182 || 3–2
|- style="background-color:#ffbbbb"
| 6 || April 9 || @ Cubs || 4–8 || Williamson || Isringhausen || || 39,839 || 3–3
|- style="background-color:#bbffbb"
| 7 || April 10 || Brewers || 6–4 || Mulder || Ohka || Isringhausen || 41,936 || 4–3
|- style="background-color:#bbffbb"
| 8 || April 12 || Brewers || 8–3 || Marquis || Bush || || 40,648 || 5–3
|- style="background-color:#ffbbbb"
| 9 || April 13 || Brewers || 3–4(11) || de la Rosa || Isringhausen || Turnbow || 40,222 || 5–4
|- style="background-color:#ffbbbb"
| 10 || April 14 || Reds || 0–1 || Harang || Carpenter || Weathers || 40,901 || 5–5
|- style="background-color:#bbffbb"
| 11 || April 15 || Reds || 9–3 || Ponson || Williams || || 40,752 || 6–5
|- style="background-color:#bbffbb"
| 12 || April 16 || Reds || 8–7 || Looper || Weathers || || 40,068 || 7–5
|- style="background-color:#bbffbb"
| 13 || April 17 || @ Pirates || 2–1 || Marquis || Maholm || Isringhausen || 15,278 || 8–5
|- style="background-color:#ffbbbb"
| 14 || April 18 || @ Pirates || 4–12 || Ol. Perez || Suppan || || 16,682 || 8–6
|- style="background-color:#bbffbb"
| 15 || April 19 || @ Pirates || 4–0 || Carpenter || Santos || || 15,085 || 9–6
|- style="background-color:#bbffbb"
| 16 || April 21 || Cubs || 9–3 || Mulder || Williams || || 41,379 || 10–6
|- style="background-color:#bbffbb"
| 17 || April 22 || Cubs || 4–1 || Ponson || Rusch || Isringhausen || 41,424 || 11–6
|- style="background-color:#ffbbbb"
| 18 || April 23 || Cubs || 3–7 || Maddux || Marquis || || 41,373 || 11–7
|- style="background-color:#bbffbb"
| 19 || April 24 || Pirates || 7–2 || Carpenter || Ol. Perez || || 38,953 || 12–7
|- style="background-color:#bbffbb"
| 20 || April 25 || Pirates || 6–3 || Suppan || Santos || Isringhausen || 38,809 || 13–7
|- style="background-color:#bbffbb"
| 21 || April 26 || Pirates || 4–3 || Isringhausen || R. Hernandez ||  || 38,728 || 14–7
|- style="background-color:#bbffbb"
| 22 || April 27 || Nationals || 6–2 || Ponson || O'Connor ||  || 39,515 || 15–7
|- style="background-color:#ffbbbb"
| 23 || April 28 || Nationals || 3–8 || Armas || Marquis ||  || 40,841 || 15–8
|- style="background-color:#bbffbb"
| 24 || April 29 || Nationals || 2–1 || Looper || Rauch|| Isringhausen || 39,596 || 16–8
|- style="background-color:#bbffbb"
| 25 || April 30 || Nationals || 9–2 || Suppan || Day || || 39,383 || 17–8

|- style="background-color:#ffbbbb"
| 26 || May 1 || @ Reds || 1–6 || Arroyo || Mulder || || 20,900 || 17–9
|- style="background-color:#ffbbbb"
| 27 || May 2 || @ Reds || 2–3 || Coffey || Falkenborg || || 25,127 || 17–10
|- style="background-color:#ffbbbb"
| 28 || May 3 || @ Astros || 4–5 || Oswalt || Marquis || Lidge  || 37,305 || 17–11
|- style="background-color:#ffbbbb"
| 29 || May 4 || @ Astros || 3–4 || Pettitte || Carpenter || Lidge || 37,290 || 17–12
|- style="background-color:#bbffbb"
| 30 || May 5 || @ Marlins || 7–2 || Suppan || Mitre || || 13,266 || 18–12
|- style="background-color:#bbffbb"
| 31 || May 6 || @ Marlins || 7–6 || Mulder || Willis || Isringhausen || 14,369 || 19–12
|- style="background-color:#bbffbb"
| 32 || May 7 || @ Marlins || 9–1 || Hancock || Olsen || || 13,057 || 20–12
|- style="background-color:#ffbbbb"
| 33 || May 8 || Rockies || 2–6 || Francis || Marquis || Fuentes || 39,007 || 20–13
|- style="background-color:#bbffbb"
| 34 || May 9 || Rockies || 4–2 || Wainwright || Mesa || Isringhausen || 40,375 || 21–13
|- style="background-color:#bbffbb"
| 35 || May 10 || Rockies || 7–4 || Suppan || B. Kim || Isringhausen || 39,108 || 22–13
|- style="background-color:#bbffbb"
| 36 || May 12 || Diamondbacks || 5–3 || Mulder || Cruz || Isringhausen || 41,085 || 23–13
|- style="background-color:#bbffbb"
| 37 || May 13 || Diamondbacks || 9–1 || Marquis || Vargas || || 40,585 || 24–13
|- style="background-color:#ffbbbb"
| 38 || May 14 || Diamondbacks || 6–7 || Vizcaino || Wainwright || Valverde || 40,891|| 24–14
|- style="background-color:#ffbbbb"
| 39 || May 16 || Mets || 3–8 || Glavine || Suppan || || 39,616 || 24–15
|- style="background-color:#bbffbb"
| 40 || May 17 || Mets || 1–0 || Mulder || Trachsel || Isringhausen || 40,573 || 25–15
|- style="background-color:#bbffbb"
| 41 || May 18 || Mets || 6–3 || Marquis || Lima || Isringhausen || 40,573 || 26–15
|- style="background-color:#bbffbb"
| 42 || May 19 || @ Royals || 9–6 || Carpenter || Redman || Wainwright || 33,045 || 27–15
|- style="background-color:#bbffbb"
| 43 || May 20 || @ Royals || 4–2 || Reyes || Bautista || Isringhausen || 40,516 || 28–15
|- style="background-color:#bbffbb"
| 44 || May 21 || @ Royals || 10–3 || Suppan || Elarton || || 30,266 || 29–15
|- style="background-color:#ffbbbb"
| 45 || May 22 || @ Giants || 2–9 || Wright || Mulder || || 38,133 || 29–16
|- style="background-color:#bbffbb"
| 46 || May 23 || @ Giants || 8–5 || Marquis || Morris || Isringhausen || 37,986 || 30–16
|- style="background-color:#bbffbb"
| 47 || May 24 || @ Giants || 10–4 || Wainwright || Lowry ||  || 37,752 || 31–16
|- style="background-color:#ffbbbb"
| 48 || May 26 || @ Padres || 1–7 || Hensley || Suppan ||  || 40,075 || 31–17
|- style="background-color:#bbffbb"
| 49 || May 27 || @ Padres || 4–3 || Ponson || Park || Isringhausen || 32,722 || 32–17
|- style="background-color:#ffbbbb"
| 50 || May 28 || @ Padres || 8–10 || Peavy|| Mulder || Hoffman || 38,145 || 32–18
|- style="background-color:#bbffbb"
| 51 || May 29 || Astros || 3–1 || Marquis || Miller || Isringhausen || 45,509 || 33–18
|- style="background-color:#ffbbbb"
| 52 || May 30 || Astros || 3–6 || Pettitte || Hancock || Lidge || 44,732 || 33–19
|- style="background-color:#bbffbb"
| 53 || May 31 || Astros || 4–3(11) || Looper || Gallo || || 43,534 || 34–19

|- style="background-color:#ffbbbb"
| 54 || June 2 || Cubs || 4–5(14) || Dempster || Hancock || || 45,799 || 34–20
|- style="background-color:#ffbbbb"
| 55 || June 3 || Cubs|| 5–8 || Rusch || Mulder || Howry || 45,820 || 34–21
|- style="background-color:#bbffbb"
| 56 || June 4 || Cubs|| 9–6 || Marquis || Maddux || Isringhausen  || 45,753 || 35–21
|- style="background-color:#ffbbbb"
| 57 || June 5 || Reds || 7–8 || Yan || Isringhausen || Coffey || 43,707 || 35–22
|- style="background-color:#ffbbbb"
| 58 || June 6 || Reds || 0–7 || Milton || Carpenter || || 43,857 || 35–23
|- style="background-color:#ffbbbb"
| 59 || June 7 || Reds || 4–7 || Harang || Ponson || Coffey || 44,306 || 35–24
|- style="background-color:#bbffbb"
| 60 || June 9 || @ Brewers || 10–6 || Hancock || Winkelsas || Isringhausen || 24,490 || 36–24
|- style="background-color:#ffbbbb"
| 61 || June 10 ||@ Brewers || 3–4 || Wise || Flores || Turnbow || 36,981 || 36–25
|- style="background-color:#bbffbb"
| 62 || June 11 || @ Brewers || 7–5 || Hancock || Bush || Isringhausen || 29,122 || 37–25
|- style="background-color:#bbffbb"
| 63 || June 13 || @ Pirates || 2–1 || Carpenter || Ol. Perez|| Isringhausen || 24,443 || 38–25
|- style="background-color:#ffbbbb"
| 64 || June 14 || @ Pirates || 7–9 || Duke || Ponson || Gonzalez || 20,289 || 38–26
|- style="background-color:#bbffbb"
| 65 || June 15 || @ Pirates || 6–5 || Mulder || Santos || Isringhausen || 18,248 || 39–26
|- style="background-color:#bbffbb"
| 66 || June 16 || Rockies || 8–1 || Marquis || Cook || || 45,736 || 40–26
|- style="background-color:#bbffbb"
| 67 || June 17 || Rockies || 6–5 || Suppan || Francis || Isringhausen || 45,968 || 41–26
|- style="background-color:#bbffbb"
| 68 || June 18 || Rockies || 4–1 || Carpenter || Fogg || Isringhausen || 45,647 || 42–26
|- style="background-color:#ffbbbb"
| 69 || June 20 || @ White Sox || 6–20 || Vazquez || Mulder || || 39,463 || 42–27
|- style="background-color:#ffbbbb"
| 70 || June 21 || @ White Sox || 5–13 || Buehrle || Marqus || || 37,897 || 42–28
|- style="background-color:#ffbbbb"
| 71 || June 22 || @ White Sox || 0–1 || Garcia || Reyes || Jenks || 39,509 || 42–29
|- style="background-color:#ffbbbb"
| 72 || June 23 || @ Tigers || 6–10 || Verlander || Carpenter || || 42,238 || 42–30
|- style="background-color:#ffbbbb"
| 73 || June 24 || @ Tigers || 6–7(10) || Zumaya || Johnson || || 42,535 || 42–31
|- style="background-color:#ffbbbb"
| 74 || June 25 || @ Tigers || 1–4 || Ledezma || Ponson || Jones || 40,644 || 42–32
|- style="background-color:#ffbbbb"
| 75 || June 26 || Indians || 3–10 || Lee || Marquis ||  || 44,659 || 42–33
|- style="background-color:#ffbbbb"
| 76 || June 27 || Indians || 1–3 || Sabathia || Reyes || Wickman || 44,446 || 42–34
|- style="background-color:#bbffbb"
| 77 || June 28 || Indians || 5–4 || Isringhausen || Wickman || || 44,628 || 43–34
|- style="background-color:#ffbbbb"
| 78 || June 30 || Royals || 5–7(10) || Burgos || Looper || || 45,884 || 43–35

|- style="background-color:#ffbbbb"
| 79 || July 1 || Royals || 7–8(11) || Hudson || Isringhausen || || 45,035 || 43–36
|- style="background-color:#bbffbb"
| 80 || July 2 || Royals || 9–7 || Marquis || Wood || || 45,400 || 44–36
|- style="background-color:#ffbbbb"
| 81 || July 3 || @ Braves || 3–6 || Smoltz || Reyes || Sosa  || 40,011 || 44–37
|- style="background-color:#bbffbb"
| 82 || July 4 || @ Braves || 6–3 || Carpenter || Thomson || Isringhausen || 47,514 || 45–37
|- style="background-color:#ffbbbb"
| 83 || July 5 || @ Braves || 4–14 || James || Suppan || || 28,705 || 45–38
|- style="background-color:#ffbbbb"
| 84 || July 6 || @ Astros || 2–4 || Buchholz || Ponson || Lidge || 41,528 || 45–39
|- style="background-color:#bbffbb"
| 85 || July 7 || @ Astros || 8–2 || Marquis || Rodriguez || Isringhausen || 43,236 || 46–39
|- style="background-color:#bbffbb"
| 86 || July 8 || @ Astros || 7–6(10) || Isringhausen || Oswalt || || 43,424 || 47–39
|- style="background-color:#bbffbb"
| 87 || July 9 || @ Astros || 7–5(12) || Looper || Lidge || Hancock || 41,652 || 48–39
|- style="background-color:#bbffbb"
| 88 || July 13 || Dodgers || 3–2(14) || Looper || Perez|| || 45,156 || 49–39
|- style="background-color:#bbffbb"
| 89 || July 14 || Dodgers || 5–0 || Carpenter || Lowe || || 45,704 || 50–39
|- style="background-color:#bbffbb"
| 90 || July 15 || Dodgers || 2–1(10) || Looper || Baez || || 46,068 || 51–39
|- style="background-color:#bbffbb"
| 91 || July 16 || Dodgers || 11–3 || Reyes || Penny || || 44,741 || 52–39
|- style="background-color:#ffbbbb"
| 92 || July 17 || Braves || 3–15 || Ramirez || Weaver || || 44,507 || 52–40
|- style="background-color:#ffbbbb"
| 93 || July 18 || Braves || 5–14 || Hudson || Marquis || || 44,718 || 52–41
|- style="background-color:#bbffbb"
| 94 || July 19 || Braves || 8–3 || Carpenter || Shiell || || 43,991 || 53–41
|- style="background-color:#bbffbb"
| 95 || July 21 || @ Dodgers || 2–0 || Suppan || Penny || Isringhausen || 47,987 || 54–41
|- style="background-color:#bbffbb"
| 96 || July 22 || @ Dodgers || 6–1 || Weaver || Sele || || 50,438 || 55–41
|- style="background-color:#bbffbb"
| 97 || July 23 || @ Dodgers || 6–1 || Marquis || Billingsley || || 43,650 || 56–41
|- style="background-color:#ffbbbb"
| 98 || July 24 || @ Rockies || 0–7 || Francis || Reyes || || 28,830 || 56–42
|- style="background-color:#bbffbb"
| 99 || July 25 || @ Rockies || 1–0 || Carpenter || Jennings || Isringhausen || 31,673 || 57–42
|- style="background-color:#bbffbb"
| 100 || July 26 || @ Rockies || 6–1 || Suppan || Cook || || 32,872 || 58–42
|- style="background-color:#ffbbbb"
| 101 || July 27|| @ Cubs || 4–5 || Novoa || Johnson || Dempster || 40,346 || 58–43
|- style="background-color:#ffbbbb"
| 102 || July 28 || @ Cubs || 5–6 || Marmol || Marquis || Dempster || 40,420 || 58–44
|- style="background-color:#ffbbbb"
| 103 || July 29 || @ Cubs || 2–4 || Maddux || Reyes|| Dempster || 41,302 || 58–45
|- style="background-color:#ffbbbb"
| 104 || July 30 || @ Cubs || 3–6 || Zambrano || Carpenter || || 40,033 || 58–46

|- style="background-color:#ffbbbb"
| 105 || August 1 || Phillies || 3–5 || Mathieson || Suppan || Gordon || 42773 || 58–47
|- style="background-color:#ffbbbb"
| 106 || August 2 || Phillies || 8–16 || Myers || Weaver || || 42,598 || 58–48
|- style="background-color:#ffbbbb"
| 107 || August 3 || Phillies || 1–8 || Hamels || Marquis || || 42,461 || 58–49
|- style="background-color:#ffbbbb"
| 108 || August 4 || Brewers || 3–4 || Davis || Carpenter || Cordero || 43,162 || 58–50
|- style="background-color:#bbffbb"
| 109 || August 5 || Brewers || 4–3 || Reyes || Sheets || Isringhausen || 43,299 || 59–50
|- style="background-color:#bbffbb"
| 110 || August 6 || Brewers || 7–1 || Suppan || Capuano || Sosa || 43,140 || 60–50
|- style="background-color:#bbffbb"
| 111 || August 7 || @ Reds || 13–1 || Weaver || Ramirez || || 34,262 || 61–50
|- style="background-color:#ffbbbb"
| 112 || August 8 || @ Reds || 3–10 || Milton || Marquis || || 40,094 || 61–51
|- style="background-color:#ffbbbb"
| 113 || August 9 || @ Reds || 7–8 || Franklin || Isringhausen || || 41,649 || 61–52
|- style="background-color:#bbffbb"
| 114 || August 10 || @ Reds || 6–1 || Reyes || Arroyo || || 39,591 || 62–52
|- style="background-color:#ffbbbb"
| 115 || August 11 || @ Pirates || 1–7 || Duke || Suppan || || 30,516 || 62–53
|- style="background-color:#ffbbbb"
| 116 || August 12 || @ Pirates || 2–3 || Snell || Weaver || Gonzalez || 35,037 || 62–54
|- style="background-color:#ffbbbb"
| 117 || August 13 || @ Pirates || 0–7 || Maholm || Marquis|| || 27,101 || 62–55
|- style="background-color:#bbffbb"
| 118 || August 15 || Reds || 5–0 || Carpenter || Harang || || 42,761 || 63–55
|- style="background-color:#ffbbbb"
| 119 || August 16 || Reds || 2–7 || Arroyo || Reyes || || 42,752 || 63–56
|- style="background-color:#bbffbb"
| 120 || August 17 || Reds || 2–1 || Isringhausen || Franklin || || 40,346 || 64–56
|- style="background-color:#bbffbb"
| 121 || August 18 || @ Cubs || 11–3 || Marquis || Marmol || || 40,346 || 65–56
|- style="background-color:#ffbbbb"
| 122 || August 19 || @ Cubs || 4–5(10) || Wuertz || Isringhausen || || 40,864 || 65–57
|- style="background-color:#bbffbb"
| 123 || August 20 || @ Cubs || 5–3 || Carpenter || Mateo || Isringhausen || 40,485 || 66–57
|- style="background-color:#ffbbbb"
| 124 || August 22 || @ Mets || 7–8 || Heilman || Isringhausen || || 49,661 || 66–58
|- style="background-color:#ffbbbb"
| 125 || August 23 || @ Mets || 8–10 || Trachsel || Mulder || Wagner || 49,329 || 66–59
|- style="background-color:#ffbbbb"
| 126 || August 24 || @ Mets || 2–6 || Williams || Marquis || || 45,497 || 66–60
|- style="background-color:#bbffbb"
| 127 || August 25|| Cubs || 2–0 || Suppan || Mateo || Isringhausen || 46,004 || 67–60
|- style="background-color:#bbffbb"
| 128 || August 26 || Cubs || 2–1 || Flores || Novoa || || 46,036 || 68–60
|- style="background-color:#bbffbb"
| 129 || August 27 || Cubs || 10–6 || Looper || Howry || || 44,937|| 69–60
|- style="background-color:#ffbbbb"
| 130 || August 29 || Marlins || 1–9 || Olsen || Mulder|| || 40,663 || 69–61
|- style="background-color:#bbffbb"
| 131 || August 30 || Marlins || 13–6 || Marquis || Nolasco || || 41,322 || 70–61
|- style="background-color:#bbffbb"
| 132 || August 31 || Marlins || 5–2 || Looper || Mitre || Isringhausen || 40,989 || 71–61

|- style="background-color:#bbffbb"
| 133 || September 1 || Pirates || 3–1 || Carpenter || Duke || || 42,091 || 72–61
|- style="background-color:#ffbbbb"
| 134 || September 2 || Pirates || 0–1 || Capps || Weaver || Torres || 41,466 || 72–62
|- style="background-color:#bbffbb"
| 135 || September 3 || Pirates || 6–3 || Reyes || Snell || || 42,205 || 73–62
|- style="background-color:#ffbbbb"
| 136 || September 4 || @ Nationals || 1–4 || Ortiz || Marquis || || 31,092 || 73–63
|- style="background-color:#bbffbb"
| 137 || September 5 || @ Nationals || 2–0 || Suppan || Astacio || Isringhausen || 25,937 || 74–63
|- style="background-color:#ffbbbb"
| 138 || September 6 || @ Nationals || 6–7 || Cordero || Isringhausen || || 21,322 || 74–64
|- style="background-color:#bbffbb"
| 139 || September 7 || @ Diamondbacks || 6–2|| Weaver || Batista || || 29,998 || 75–64
|- style="background-color:#ffbbbb"
| 140 || September 8 || @ Diamondbacks || 1–13 || L. Hernandez || Reyes || || 25,229 || 75–65
|- style="background-color:#ffbbbb"
| 141 || September 9 || @ Diamondbacks || 0–3 || Webb || Marquis || || 33,619 || 75–66
|- style="background-color:#ffbbbb"
| 142 || September 10 || @ Diamondbacks || 7–9 || Vizcaino || Sosa || Valverde || 25,381 || 75–67
|- style="background-color:#bbffbb"
| 143 || September 11 || Astros || 7–0 || Carpenter || Buchholz || || 41,061 || 76–67
|- style="background-color:#bbffbb"
| 144 || September 12 || Astros || 6–5 || Looper || Lidge || || 41,453 || 77–67
|- style="background-color:#ffbbbb"
| 145 || September 13 || Astros || 1–5 || Oswalt || Marquis|| Wheeler || 40,459 || 77–68
|- style="background-color:#bbffbb"
| 146 || September 15 || Giants || 14–4 || Suppan || Hennessey || || 45,927 || 78–68
|- style="background-color:#bbffbb"
| 147 || September 16 || Giants || 6–1 || Carpenter || Morris || || 45,445 || 79–68
|- style="background-color:#bbbbbb"
| – || September 17 || Giants || colspan=5|Cancelled || 79–68
|- style="background-color:#ffbbbb"
| 148 || September 18 || @ Brewers || 3–4 || Cordero || Looper || || 19,360 || 79–69
|- style="background-color:#bbffbb"
| 149 || September 19 || @ Brewers || 12–2 || Weaver || Sheets || || 15,204 || 80–69
|- style="background-color:#ffbbbb"
| 150 || September 20 || @ Brewers || 0–1 || Cordero || Johnson || || 14,242 || 80–70
|- style="background-color:#ffbbbb"
| 151 || September 21 || @ Astros || 5–6 || Borkowski || Carpenter || Wheeler || 32,975 || 80–71
|- style="background-color:#ffbbbb"
| 152 || September 22 || @ Astros || 5–6 || Qualls || Looper || || 39,616 || 80–72
|- style="background-color:#ffbbbb"
| 153 || September 23 || @ Astros || 4–7 || Wheeler || Johnson || || 43,469 || 80–73
|- style="background-color:#ffbbbb"
| 154 || September 24|| @ Astros || 3–7 || Qualls || Hancock || || 43,704 || 80–74
|- style="background-color:#ffbbbb"
| 155 || September 25 || Padres || 5–6 || Cassidy || Thompson || Linebrink || 40,149 || 80–75
|- style="background-color:#ffbbbb"
| 156 || September 26 || Padres || 5–7 || Williams || Carpenter || Hoffman || 40,443 || 80–76
|- style="background-color:#bbffbb"
| 157 || September 27 || Padres || 4–2 || Johnson || Linebrink || Wainwright || 40,358 || 81–76
|- style="background-color:#ffbbbb"
| 158 || September 28 || Brewers || 4–9 || Davis || Marquis || || 40,313 || 81–77
|- style="background-color:#bbffbb"
| 159 || September 29 || Brewers || 10–5 || Weaver || Capuano || || 41,718 || 82–77
|- style="background-color:#bbffbb"
| 160 || September 30 || Brewers || 3–2 || Johnson || Shouse || Wainwright || 44,294 || 83–77

|- style="background-color:#ffbbbb"
| 161 || October 1 || Brewers || 3–5 || Villanueva || Reyes || || 44,133 || 83–78

Farm system

References

External links

2006 Cardinals home page and game log at Retrosheet
2006 Division Series, League Championship Series, and World Series at Retrosheet
Official website  of the St. Louis Cardinals
2006 Cardinals statistics (including links to postseason statistics) at Baseball Reference
2006 St. Louis Cardinals team page at www.baseball-almanac.com

St. Louis Cardinals seasons
St. Louis Cardinals season
National League Central champion seasons
National League champion seasons
World Series champion seasons
St Louis